Escadrille Spa.76 was a French fighter and reconnaissance squadron active during the First World War years of 1916 to 1918. Cited for taking more than 3,000 aerial photographs for military intelligence purposes, the unit was also credited with destroying 26 German aircraft.

History
Escadrille Spa.76 was founded in August 1916 at Lyon. Its original equipment of Caudron R.IV bombers was quickly replaced by Nieuport fighters, and the new unit designated Escadrille N.76 before its 8 September transfer to the V Armee at Muizon. 
 
It was refitted with SPAD S.VII and SPAD S.XIII fighters in late 1917, causing it to be renamed Escadrille Spa.76.

After the war's end, on 2 February 1919, Escadille Spa.76 would be mentioned in dispatches for having fought in 440 dogfights and destroying 26 German aircraft, as well as flying 70 reconnaissance missions resulting in more than 3,000 photographs.

Commanding officers

 Capitaine Rene Doumer: August 1916 - missing in action 26 April 1917
 Capitaine Jean-Jacques Perrin: 26 April 1917 - ?
 Capitaine Eugene Verdon: ?
 Lieutenant Pierre Vitoux: 6 May 1917

Aircraft

 Caudron R.IVs
 Nieuport fighters: c. 8 September 1916 - late 1917
 SPAD S.VII and SPAD S.XIII fighters: Late 1917 - war's end

End notes

Reference
 Franks, Norman; Bailey, Frank (1993). Over the Front: The Complete Record of the Fighter Aces and Units of the United States and French Air Services, 1914–1918 London, UK: Grub Street Publishing. .

Fighter squadrons of the French Air and Space Force
Military units and formations established in 1916
Military units and formations disestablished in 1918
Military units and formations of France in World War I
Military aviation units and formations in World War I